Philosophical presentism is the view that only present entities exist (or, equivalently, that everything is present). According to presentism, there are no past or future entities. In a sense, the past and the future do not exist for presentists—past events have happened (have existed) and future events will happen (will exist), but neither exist at all since they do not exist now. Presentism is a view about temporal ontology that contrasts with eternalism—the view that past, present and future entities exist (that is, the ontological thesis of the 'block universe')—and with no-futurism—the view that only past and present entities exist (that is, the ontological thesis of the 'growing block universe').

Historical antecedents
Augustine of Hippo proposed that the present is analogous to a knife edge placed exactly between the perceived past and the imaginary future and does not include the concept of time.  Proponents claim this should be self-evident because, if the present is extended, it must have separate parts—but these must be simultaneous if they are truly a part of the present. According to early philosophers, time cannot be simultaneously past and present and hence not extended. Contrary to Saint Augustine, some philosophers propose that conscious experience is extended in time. For instance, William James said that time is "the short duration of which we are immediately and incessantly sensible". Other early presentist philosophers include the Indian Buddhist tradition. Fyodor Shcherbatskoy, a leading scholar of the modern era on Buddhist philosophy, has written extensively on Buddhist presentism: "Everything past is unreal, everything future is unreal, everything imagined, absent, mental... is unreal. Ultimately, real is only the present moment of physical efficiency [i.e., causation]."

According to J. M. E. McTaggart's "The Unreality of Time", there are two ways of referring to events: the 'A Series' (or 'tensed time': yesterday, today, tomorrow) and the 'B Series' (or 'untensed time': Monday, Tuesday, Wednesday). Presentism posits that the A Series is fundamental and that the B Series alone is not sufficient. Presentists maintain that temporal discourse requires the use of tenses, whereas the "Old B-Theorists" argued that tensed language could be reduced to tenseless facts (Dyke, 2004).

Arthur N. Prior has argued against un-tensed theories with the following ideas: the meaning of statements such as "Thank goodness that's over" is much easier to see in a tensed theory with a distinguished, present now. Similar arguments can be made to support the theory of egocentric presentism (or perspectival realism), which holds that there is a distinguished, present self.

In the modern theory of relativity, the conceptual observer is at a geometric point in both space and time at the apex of the 'light cone' which observes the events laid out in time as well as space. Different observers may disagree on whether two events at different locations occurred simultaneously depending on whether the observers are in relative motion (see relativity of simultaneity). This theory depends upon the idea of time as an extended thing and has been confirmed by experiment, thus giving rise to a philosophical viewpoint known as four dimensionalism. Although the contents of an observation are time-extended, the conceptual observer, being a geometric point at the origin of the light cone, is not extended in time or space. This analysis contains a paradox in which the conceptual observer contains nothing, even though any real observer would need to be the extended contents of an observation to exist. This paradox is partially resolved in relativity theory by defining a 'frame of reference' to encompass the measuring instruments used by an observer. This reduces the time separation between instruments to a set of constant intervals.

Some of the difficulties and paradoxes of presentism can be resolved by changing the normal view of time as a container or thing unto itself and seeing time as a measure of changing spatial relationships among objects. Thus, observers need not be extended in time to exist and to be aware, but they rather exist and the changes in internal relationships within the observer can be measured by stable countable events.

Philosophical objections
One main objection to presentism comes from the idea that what is true substantively depends upon what exists (or, that truth depends or 'supervenes' upon being). In particular, presentism is said to be in conflict with truth-maker theory, one theory which looks to capture the dependence of truth upon being with the idea that truths (e.g., true propositions) are true in virtue of the existence of some entity or entities ('truth-makers'). The conflict arises because most presentists accept that there are evidence-transcendent and objective truths about the past (and some accept that there are truths about the future, pace concerns about fatalism), but presentists deny the existence of the obvious truth-makers for such truths. For instance, most presentists accept that it is true that Marie Curie discovered polonium, but they deny that the event of her discovery exists (because it is a wholly past event). Presentists have been charged with violating the plausible truth-maker principle (that truths require truth-makers) and ontologically 'cheating'. Presentists can respond to this objection either by denying that truths about the past require truth-makers (that is, they can accept the truth-maker principle for some truths, but deny that it applies in full generality, or else reject the truth-maker principle wholesale), or by locating presently existing entities to play the role of truth-makers for truths about the past.

See also
 Appeal to novelty
 A-series and B-series
 Arrow of time
 Centered worlds
 Endurantism
 Eternity
 Growing block universe
 Perdurantism
 Problem of future contingents
 Specious present

References

External links
 .
 .
 Dowden, Bradley. "Time". Internet Encyclopedia of Philosophy.
 
 .
 .
 . Describes Presentism and how four dimensionalism contradicts it.

Metaphysical theories
Philosophy of time
Theory of relativity